The East Asia Institute (German: Ostasieninstitut) founded in 1989, as part of the Ludwigshafen University of Applied Sciences. It offers four year or eight-semester programs (BA) in international business management combined with country module of China, Japan, and Korea covering cultural and language studies.

Name
English: East Asia Institute
French: Institut pour l'Asie de l'est
German: Ostasieninstitut
Russian: Институт Восточной Азии (Institut Wostotschnoiy Azii)

Chinese: 东亚学院 (Dongya Xueyuan)
Japanese: 東アジアセンター (Higashi Ajia Senta)
Korean: 동아시아연구소 (Dong-Asia Yeonguso)

Activities and mission

The mission of the Institute extends beyond education to include the facilitation of business relations between the state of Rheinland-Palatinate and Asia (especially China and Japan).

Currently the Institute benefits from a steady partnership with the Chinese province Fujian and the Japanese region Iwate. The Institute is also a partner in business consulting MSEs and global companies doing business in Asia.

Study abroad
Depending on the country module chosen students spend one year (5th and 6th semesters) in China, Korea or Japan studying at one of our affiliated universities. Students may elect to complement their studies by completing an apprenticeship.

The East Asia Institute has partnerships to the following institutions in the People's Republic of China, Korea and Japan:
Fuzhou University in Fuzhou, Fujian
Guangxi University in Nanning, Guangxi
Guilin University of Electronic Technology in Guilin, Guangxi
Guizhou University in Guiyang, Guizhou
Hebei North University in Zhangjiakou, Hebei
Takasaki Economics University in Takasaki, Gunma
Kansai Gaidai in Hirakata, Osaka
Akita International University in Akita, Akita
Nagoya City University in Nagoya, Aichi
Konkuk University in Seoul
Korea University in Sejong
Kyonggi University in Seoul
Pukyong National University in Busan
Seoul National University of Science and Technology in Seoul

Student life
Enrolment in the programme is limited resulting in small cohorts of selected students who largely stay together for the duration of their studies except during the year abroad where students are at different universities in China and Japan. The small group sizes and low teacher-to-student ratio leads to a strong group identity which extends beyond the studies in the form of a graduate network.

StEAM (Students of East Asia Marketing) is a student association which, among other, functions contributes positively to student life by promoting cultural and social events for students.

History
1988: Foundation of the East Asia Institute as a part of the University of Applied Science in Ludwigshafen, Germany
1995: Transfer from the Emil Helfferich Collection from Neustadt to Ludwigshafen
1997: New construction of the East Asia Institute on the Rhine River
1997: Visit from the federal president Roman Herzog
2000: Visit from the federal president Johannes Rau
2001: Reopening of the Emil Helfferich Collection in the institute
2004: Change of the current program to Bachelor

See also
 East Asian studies

External links
East Asia Institute
StEAM (Students of East Asia Marketing)

East Asian studies
Universities of Applied Sciences in Germany